James Tahhan (born October 26, 1988) is a Venezuelan chef, television personality, restaurateur, and author who uses the stage name of Chef James. He is best recognized for being the official chef of Telemundo, and being a co-presenter of its morning show Un Nuevo Dia. In 2014, together with his friend, television personality Raúl González, Chef James opened his first restaurant, Sabores – by Chef James . It has subsequently been named one of the best restaurants in Miami. In 2016, Chef James released a cookbook, The Homemade Chef: Ordinary Ingredients for Extraordinary Food.

Early life and education 
James Tahhan was born in Los Teques, Venezuela, the son of Bachir Wahbi Tahhan, of Syrian-Armenian descent, and Mimi Masri, of Syrian-Venezuelan descent. He was later joined by one brother, Wahbi Tahhan. During his formative years, James learned home cooking from his parents. During this period, James was also influenced by David Abal, a neighbor and professional chef from Galician descent, who taught James the basics of at-home cooking.

At the age of 13, James emigrated to the United States with his mother, ultimately settling in Miami, Florida. James began to work to help his mother pay the household bills.

James suffered from childhood obesity, yet this did not impede him from pursuing sports. James particularly excelled in martial arts, where he was twice ranked number one in his division, and won the US Open Martial Arts Championship.

At the age of 16, Tahhan decided to go to college and study chemistry to become a dentist. At the same time, he started working on radio, as a spokesperson for different brands and products, where his advertisements played on radio stations including WAMR-FM, WAQI, and WMGE.

After two years, Tahhan attended Le Cordon Bleu College of Culinary Arts Miami, where he specialized in international cuisine and pastries. While attending school, he also started his own catering business, called Avokado.

Television career

Early career
His first job after graduating from Le Cordon Bleu was as a line-cook at "Arabian Nights", a Mediterranean restaurant in Miami.

After almost six years working with different brands and products on radio, Tahhan auditioned for a position in Telemundo. He responded to an open-call audition for Telemundo's morning show Levantate (now known as Un Nuevo Día). He was named the official chef co-host of the show and the network.

Telemundo
Currently, Tahhan is a co-host of the morning show, Un Nuevo Día, which has earned him two Emmy Awards.

Tahhan has crossed-over to the English market. During an initiative named "Healthy Week" by the network NBC Universal, he spoke to American viewers, promoting healthy meals that could be made at home.

During Hispanic Heritage Month, Tahhan was chosen to participate in segments of the Today Show, where he shared his thoughts on Latin American dishes.

Utilísima
In March 2012, James was selected by Utilísima to be one of their newest faces on their hit T.V. show, "Puro Chef". He has subsequently participated on the 4th and 5th season of the show, and has conducted the special Thanksgiving edition.

Author 
In 2016, Tahhan released a cookbook, The Homemade Chef: Ordinary Ingredients for Extraordinary Food. The cookbook become a best-seller both regionally and internationally on Amazon.com.
Tahhan is also a food columnist and has written for "Venue Magazine", where he gives readers recipes, cooking advice, and his thoughts on healthy living.

Restaurateur

In 2014, Tahhan opened his first restaurant, Sabores, together with his friend and television personality, Raúl González. "People think it's rice and beans and shredded meat, and really it's this hidden treasure that nobody has pushed. We wanted to change that," he said. He first traveled to Latin America to better understand Latin American cuisine.

Public image

Tahhan has been named one of the leading Latin chefs in the U.S, and "Miami's Hottest Chef". Once source commented, "Not many chefs have their own restaurant, host an Emmy-award winning television morning show…but James Tahhan isn’t like many chefs." In 2013 and 2014, Chef James was recognized by Latin Gourmet as the Chef of the Year.

Tahhan has been awarded the "Social Media Chef" of the year. He was selected for the "50 Most Beautiful People" edition of People en Español magazine.

Telemundo suspended Tahhan and Janice Bencosme indefinitely after the two made an offensive "slant eyes" gesture on-camera while celebrating South Korea being knocked out of the 2018 World Cup to allow Mexico to advance.

References

Venezuelan people of Syrian descent
Venezuelan chefs
Venezuelan television chefs
People from Miranda (state)
1988 births
Living people
Venezuelan emigrants to the United States